Harrison Park may refer to:

 Harrison Park (Leek), a stadium in Leek, Staffordshire
 Harrison Park (New Jersey), a former baseball ground in Harrison, New Jersey
 Municipality of Harrison Park, a rural municipality in Manitoba
 Harrison Park, a public park in Edinburgh, Scotland

See also
 Harrison Hills Park, a county park in Allegheny County, Pennsylvania